Crook of Devon is a village within the parish of Fossoway in Kinross-shire about  west of Kinross on the A977 road. Its name derives from the nearly 180-degree turn, from generally eastwards to generally westwards and resembling the shape of a shepherd's crook, which the River Devon makes at the village.

History

The village is located on what was a major medieval east-west route between Stirling and St Andrews at the lowest point on the river which is often fordable, and where it was crossed by a major north-south road from Glen Devon (the main pass through the Ochil Hills range to the north) that skirted around the bend in the river. The combination of crossroads and ford encouraged an early settlement, and in 1615 it was raised to a Burgh of Barony by James VI for the local landowner John Halliday of Tullibole. The classic triangular shape of its marketplace can still be seen in the roads and field boundaries of the Back Crook area close to the former ford, although the diversion away from the marketplace of both of its major roads with the construction of the Rumbling Bridge and Crook of Devon bridges in the following 150 years prevented it taking off as a commercial hub, so while the Back Crook remained or reverted to being relatively undeveloped, the focus of the village gradually moved southwards to coalesce along the new east-west road, now the A977, and its character is now largely 19th century.

It was infamous in the 17th century for its witch trials and executions. Down the road at the side of the Institute (Village Hall) on the right side is a field called Lamblaires and in the northwest corner is the place where the witches were strangled and their bodies burned at the stake.

In 1789 the heirs of the Hallidays of Tullibole suffered a financial crisis and large parts of the estate were sold off, including the by-now almost abandoned marketplace which was bought by the Moodie family of the neighbouring estate of Moor (now Naemoor, its land having been drained in the 19th century). They dismantled and salvaged the stone of its symbolic mercat cross, although a surviving relic of the cross shaft suggests that it must have been a substantial construction, probably not unlike that at Clackmannan or Doune.

In the 1830s the Naemoor Estate was bought by the Moubray family, major shareholders of the Alloa Coal company, and the 19th century expansion of the village was continued largely under their control. The estate was broken up and sold on May 16, 1946, and almost all of its houses are now owned individually. Modern housing developments began in the 1960s and 70s but the major development of West Crook Way at the west end of the village was built in the 1990s.

Fossoway Church
A church has stood in the village since Pre-Reformation times but the church dates from 1729, being remodelled in 1806. It replaced the two parish churches at Tullibole and Fossoway, each of which had served separate parishes until their combination into a single parish in 1614. These were demolished in or shortly after 1729. The Elizabeth Wilkie Hall was added in 2000.

Notable log-serving ministers include Laurence Mercer (primus) who served 1607 to 1652 later assisted by his son Laurence Mercer (secondus). Rev Andrew Ure served 1717 to 1742. Rev John Storer served 1743 to 1778. William Graham served from 1778 to 1803 and his son George Graham served until 1824. Rev Peter Brydie served from 1824 until the Disruption of 1843. Rev William Ferguson served 1854 to 1892 being assisted by Patrick Baeda Thom from 1889. Thom succeeded him and apart from being minister was a noted author on both religious and agricultural topics. Thom was succeeded by William Wilson Boyle in 1918.

Notable residents
James Haig Ferguson FRSE (1862–1934) surgeon, born in the manse in Fossoway.
John Luke, owned various paper mills with his sons.

William Luke, (son of papermaker John Luke) emigrated to Maryland U.S. developed the modern way to make paper from wood pulp. The town of Luke in Maryland is named after him.

References

External links

 Fossoway Website
 Overview of Crook of Devon

Villages in Perth and Kinross
Witchcraft in Scotland